The largemouth bass (Micropterus salmoides) is a carnivorous freshwater gamefish in the Centrarchidae (sunfish) family, a species of black bass native to the eastern and central United States, southeastern Canada and northern Mexico, but widely introduced elsewhere. It is known by a variety of regional names, such as the widemouth bass, bigmouth bass, black bass, bucketmouth, largies, Potter's fish, Florida bass, Florida largemouth, green bass, bucketmouth bass, Green trout, gilsdorf bass, Oswego bass, LMB, and southern largemouth and northern largemouth. The largemouth bass is the state fish of Georgia and Mississippi, and the state freshwater fish of Florida and Alabama.

Taxonomy
The largemouth bass was first formally described as Labrus salmoides in 1802 by the French naturalist Bernard Germain de Lacépède with the type locality given as the Carolinas. Lacépède based his description on an illustration of a specimen collected by Louis Bosc near Charleston, South Carolina. Recent phylogenomic studies, however, place the type locality given by Lacépède as within the range of the Florida bass (M. floridanus) and outside that of the largemouth bass. This study concludes that Lacépède's name is the correct binomial for the Florida bass and that the oldest available binomial for the largemouth bass is Cuvier's Huro nigricans, which has a type locality of Lake Huron which is within the range of the largemouth bass.

Description
The largemouth bass is an olive-green to greenish gray fish, marked by a series of dark, sometimes black, blotches forming a jagged horizontal stripe along each flank. The upper jaw (maxilla) of a largemouth bass extends beyond the rear margin of the orbit. Sexual dimorphism is found, with the female larger than the male. Average lifespan in the wild is 10 to 16 years.

Feeding
Largemouth bass generally maintain relatively small home ranges in lakes with abundant littoral vegetation. The juvenile largemouth bass consumes mostly small bait fish, scuds, water fleas, copepods, small shrimp, and insects. Adults consume smaller fish (bluegill, banded killifish, minnows), shad, worms, snails,  crawfish, frogs, snakes, and salamanders.  In larger lakes and reservoirs, adult bass occupy slightly deeper water than younger fish, and shift to a diet consisting almost entirely of smaller fish like shad, yellow perch, ciscoes, suckers, shiners, other cyprinids, freshwater silversides, and sunfish (such as bluegill and green sunfish). It also consumes younger members of larger fish species, such as catfish, trout, walleye, white bass, striped bass, and even smaller black bass. Among the crayfish species preyed upon include Orconectes difficilis, Orconectes harrisonii, Orconectes hartfieldi, and Procambarus clarkii. Prey items can be as large as 50% of the bass's body length or larger.

Studies of prey utilization by largemouths show that in weedy waters, bass grow more slowly due to difficulty in acquiring prey. Less weed cover allows bass to more easily find and catch prey, but this consists of more open-water baitfish. With little or no cover, bass can devastate the prey population and starve or be stunted. Fisheries managers must consider these factors when designing regulations for specific bodies of water. Under overhead cover, such as overhanging banks, brush, or submerged structure, such as weedbeds, points, humps, ridges, and drop-offs, the largemouth bass uses its senses of hearing, sight, vibration, and smell to attack and seize its prey. Adult largemouth are generally apex predators within their habitat, but they are preyed upon by many animals while young, including great blue herons, larger bass, northern pike, walleye, muskellunge, yellow perch, channel catfish, northern water snakes, crappie, common carp, and American eels. Multiple species of kingfishers and bitterns feed on this bass, as well. Both the young and adult largemouths are targeted by the bald eagle.

Notably in the Great Lakes Region, Micropterus salmoides along with many other species of native fish have been known to prey upon the invasive round goby (Neogobius melanostomus). Remains of said fish have been found inside the stomachs of largemouth bass consistently. This feeding habit may impact the ecosystem positively, but more research must be conducted to verify this. It is illegal to use or possess live Neogobius melanostomus as bait in the Great Lakes Region.

Spawning

Largemouth bass usually reach sexual maturity and begin spawning when they are about a year old. Spawning takes place in the spring season when the water temperature first remains continuously above  for a sufficient period of time. In the northern region of the United States and Canada, this usually occurs anywhere from late April until early July. In the southern states, where the largest and healthiest specimens typically inhabit, this process can begin in March and is usually over by June. Males form nests by moving debris from the bottom of the body of water using their tails. These nests are usually about twice the length of the males, although this can vary. Bass prefer sand, muck, or gravel bottoms, but will also use rocky and weedy bottoms where there is cover for their nest, such as roots or twigs. After finishing the nest, the males swim near the nest looking for a female to mate with. After one is found, the two bass swim around the nest together, turning their bodies so that the eggs and sperm that are being released will come in contact on the way down to the nest. Bass will usually spawn twice per spring, with some spawning three or four times, although this is not as common. The male will then guard the nest until the eggs hatch, which can take about two to four days in the southern US and Northern Mexico, and slightly longer in the northern part of its native range. Finally, depending on the water temperature, the male will stay with the nest until the infant bass are ready to swim out on their own, which can be about two more weeks after they hatch. After this, the male, female, and newborns will switch to more of a summer mode, in which they then focus more on feeding.

Angling

Largemouth bass are keenly sought after by anglers and are noted for the excitement of their 'fight', meaning how vigorously the fish resists being hauled into the boat or onto shore after being hooked. The fish will often become airborne in their effort to throw the hook, but many say that their cousin species, the smallmouth bass, is even more aggressive. Anglers most often fish for largemouth bass with lures such as Spinnerbait, plastic worms (and other plastic baits), jigs, crankbaits, and live bait, such as worms and minnows. A recent trend is the use of large swimbaits to target trophy bass that often forage on juvenile rainbow trout in California. Fly fishing for largemouth bass may be done using both topwater and worm imitations tied with natural or synthetic materials. Other live baits, such as frogs or crawfish, can also be productive. Large golden shiners are a popular live bait used to catch trophy bass, especially when they are sluggish in the heat of summer or in the cold of winter. Largemouth bass usually hang around big patches of weeds and other shallow water cover. These fish are very capable of surviving in a wide variety of climates and waters. They are perhaps one of the world's most tolerant freshwater fish.

The world record largemouth according to the IGFA is shared by Manabu Kurita and George W. Perry. This record is shared because the IGFA states a new record must beat the old record by at least 2 ounces.

Strong cultural pressure among largemouth bass anglers encourages the practice of catch and release, especially the larger specimens, mainly because larger specimens are usually breeding females that contribute heavily to future sport fishing stocks. Largemouth bass respond well to catch and release, with a very high survival rate after release, especially if the fish is handled with care and is loosely hooked in the side or top of the mouth. However, if the fish swallows the hook, survival odds greatly decrease.  Largemouth bass have a white, slightly mushy meat, lower quality than that of the smallmouth bass, bluegill, yellow perch, crappie or walleye. Small largemouth, of 10–14 inches, can contain higher quality meat, especially during the spring.

Given largemouth bass' prevalence across North America and their accessibility to the everyday angler, largemouth bass are often viewed as an introductory fish. Fishing for largemouth bass can help beginner anglers transition away from traditional "worm on a hook" angling towards fishing with artificial lures and strategies. It is often the case that recreational fishermen become "addicted to fishing" shortly after they make largemouth bass their target species. The cultural implications of largemouth bass are quite significant, as there are even competitions and tournaments specifically targeting largemouth bass in North America.

Invasive species
The largemouth bass has been introduced into many other regions and countries due to its popularity as a sport fish and tolerance to urban environments. It causes the decline, displacement or extinctions of species in its new habitat through predation and competition, for example in Namibia. They are also an invasive species in the Canadian province of New Brunswick, and are on the watch list across much of the far northern US and Canada. In colder waters, these fish are often a danger to native fish fry such as salmon and trout. They have also been blamed for the extinction of the Atitlan grebe, a large waterbird which once inhabited Lake Atitlan, Guatemala. In 2011, researchers found that in streams and rivers in the Iberian Peninsula, juvenile largemouth bass were able to demonstrate trophic plasticity, meaning that they were able to adjust their feeding habits to obtain the necessary amount of energy needed to survive. This allows them to be successful as an invasive species in relatively stable aquatic food webs. Similarly, a study done in Japan showed that the introduction of both largemouth bass and bluegill into farm ponds have caused increases in the numbers of benthic organisms, resulting from the predation on fishes, crustaceans, and nymphal odonates by the bass. The largemouth bass has been causing sharp decreases in native fish populations in Japan since 1996, especially in bitterling fish in Lake Izunuma-Uchinuma.

References

External links
 
 
 Illustration: plate 45 in Cuvier & Valenciennes (circa 1834), illustration by Werner & Smith.

Largemouth bass
Freshwater fish of the United States
Fish of the Eastern United States
Largemouth bass
Symbols of Georgia (U.S. state)
Symbols of Mississippi
Symbols of Alabama
Symbols of Florida
Taxa named by Bernard Germain de Lacépède